The United States federal Agricultural Appropriations Act of 1922 merged the Bureau of Markets and Crop Estimates (BMCE) with the Office of Farm Management and Farm Economics (OFMFE) on July 1, 1922, to form the Bureau of Agricultural Economics (BAE). Its purpose was to analyze and receive reports relating to foreign agriculture. It was the central statistical and economic research agency of the Commerce Department, which was responsible for collecting, analyzing, and publishing a wide variety of facts about agriculture. This included data on production, supply and demand, consumption, prices, costs and income, marketing, transportation, labor, agricultural finance, farm management, credit, taxation, land and water utilization, and other aspects of agricultural production and distribution.

References

United States federal agriculture legislation
United States federal appropriations legislation